Danielson Gomes Monteiro (born 6 February 1984), known as Dani, is Cape Verdean footballer who plays as a midfielder. He spent most of his career playing for clubs in the third highest level of Portuguese football. Dani played twice in the Liga de Honra, for Leiria and Olhanense.

References

External links
 Profile at Portuguese Liga 
 

1984 births
Living people
Cape Verdean footballers
Amora F.C. players
C.D. Beja players
Clube Oriental de Lisboa players
Odivelas F.C. players
U.D. Leiria players
S.C. Olhanense players
Real S.C. players
Strømmen IF players
US Sandweiler players
People from Santa Catarina, Cape Verde
Association football midfielders
Cape Verdean expatriate footballers
Expatriate footballers in Portugal
Cape Verdean expatriate sportspeople in Portugal
Expatriate footballers in Norway
Cape Verdean expatriate sportspeople in Norway
Expatriate footballers in Luxembourg
Norwegian First Division players